Chemical industry in Poland - one of the key branches of the processing industry which includes:

 organic chemistry industry – manufactures products on the basis of carbohydrates, wood, rubber, fats and other organic substances,
 non-organic chemistry industry – products manufactured on the basis of non-organic substances, e.g. minerals and ores.

Chemical industry in terms of tons of production can be divided into:

 great chemistry - the name refers to the production size of millions tons a year; great chemistry includes the production of fertilisers, fuels, plastics (mainly plasticisers) and industrial gases;
 small chemistry - production on a smaller scale - dozens of tons; this sector includes mainly chemistry with high added value and more expensive production, e.g. medicaments, cosmetics, cleaning agents;
 chemical processing - processing finished half-products: by mixing, packing, thermal treatment and other methods.

Chemical industry is characteristic of the high capital intensity and low labour consumption, for this reason, the most of operations are automated.

Chemical industry products
Divisions within the Polish chemical industry, by types of products and companies, include:

 Coking industry — for example: the coking plants "Radlin", "Jadwiga", "Dębieńsko" in Bytom, Zdzieszowice, Wałbrzych, Zabrze, and Dąbrowa Górnicza; and foundries in Kraków, Częstochowa, and Dąbrowa Górnicza.
Cleaning products industry.
 Fertilizers industry  — for example:  Grupa Azoty S.A., with plants in Puławy, Police, Mościce, Kędzierzyn-Koźle, Chorzów, Gdańsk, Grzybów; Anwil S.A. in Włocławek; Zakłady Chemiczne "Alwernia" S.A. in Alwernia; Zakłady Chemiczne "Siarkopol" in Tarnobrzeg; LUVENA S.A. in Luboń; and Fosfan S.A. in Szczecin.
 Paint and varnish industry — for example:  production plants in Cieszyn, Dębica, Wrocław, Włocławek, Chorzów and Pilawa.
 Petrochemical industry — government owned PKN Orlen, with refineries in Płock, Jedlicze, and Trzebinia; and the Lotos Group, with refineries in Gdańsk, Czechowice, and Jasło.
 Plastics production and processing industry — for example: Basell Orlen Polyolefins Sp. z o.o., Grupa Azoty, Anwil S.A., Synthos S.A., and CIECH Sarzyna S.A.
 Pharmaceutical industry — for example: pharmaceutical plants in Warsaw, Kraków, Rzeszów, Poznań, Kutno, Starogard Gdański, Jelenia Góra, Pabianice, Łódź, and Grodzisk Mazowiecki.
Plant protection industry.
 Soda (sodium carbonate) industry  — CIECH Soda Polska S.A., including plants in Inowrocław and Janikowo)'',
 Sulfuric acid industry — for example: KGHM Polska Miedź, Grupa Azoty POLICE, Zakłady Górniczo-Hutnicze Bolesław SA.
 Synthetic fibers industry — including  plants in Toruń, Gorzów Wielkopolski, Tomaszów Mazowiecki, and Sohaczew.

See also 
 
 Large scale chemical synthesis in Poland

References 

 
P
Chemical
Chemical